Maziya Sports and Recreation Club is a Maldivian professional football club based in Malé. They compete in the Dhivehi Premier League, the country's top division. The club was formed in 1996 and was promoted to the first division for the first time in 2006.

History
The club was founded on 23 January 1996. The club is one of the most successful clubs in Maldives, having won the top tier domestic league thrice in 2016, 2019–20, and 2020–21.

In the 2022 AFC Cup groups-stages, Maziya witnessed a 1–0 defeat to Bashundhara Kings, but won their second match against Gokulam Kerala. They were knocked out of the tournament after a 5–2 defeat in the last match to Indian Super League side ATK Mohun Bagan.

Seasons

Domestic

Continental

Honours
 Dhivehi Premier League
 Champions (4) :2016, 2019–20, 2020–21, 2021–22
Maldives FA Cup
 Champions (3): 2012, 2014,2022
Maldivian FA Charity Shield
 Champions (4): 2015, 2016, 2017, 2022
 Malé League
 Champions (1): 2017
President's Cup
 Champions (1): 2015
POMIS Cup
Runners-up (1): 2015

Current squad

References

External links
Maziya S&RC (archived)

Football clubs in the Maldives
Football clubs in Malé
1996 establishments in the Maldives
Association football clubs established in 1996
Dhivehi Premier League clubs